One Man's Family is an American radio soap opera, heard for almost three decades, from 1932 to 1959. Created by Carlton E. Morse, it was the longest-running uninterrupted dramatic serial in the history of American radio. Television versions of the series aired in prime time from 1949 to 1952 and in daytime from 1954 to 1955.

Radio
One Man's Family debuted as a radio series on April 29, 1932 in Los Angeles, Seattle and San Francisco, moving to the full West Coast NBC network the following month, sponsored by Snowdrift and Wesson Oil. On May 17, 1933, it expanded to the full coast-to-coast NBC network as the first West Coast show heard regularly on the East Coast. The show was broadcast as a weekly half-hour series (1933-1950) [sustained by Standard Brands from 1935 through 1949], then shifted to daily 15-minute installments, initially originating from the studios of San Francisco radio station KPO, NBC's flagship station for the West Coast, eventually moving to Los Angeles.

Characters and story
The series employed a literary device with episodes divided into books and chapters. Spanning 27 years, the program presented 136 books with 3,256 chapters. Storylines were set in the Sea Cliff area of San Francisco, California, an area familiar to San Franciscan Carlton E. Morse. The radio plotline centered on stockbroker Henry Barbour, his wife Fanny and their five children (chronologically: Paul, Hazel, the twins Clifford and Claudia, and Jack). The dialogue included many specific references to San Francisco, including the Golden Gate Bridge, which the Barbours could see from their rear living room window or their garden wall.

Over the entire 27-year run, J. Anthony Smythe starred as Henry Barbour. The first Fanny was Minetta Ellen (1932–55), followed by Mary Adams. Michael Raffetto had the role of author-aviator Paul, but a voice problem led to his replacement in 1955 by Russell Thorson. Hazel was played by Bernice Berwin (1932–58). Beginning in 1932, Barton Yarborough portrayed Clifford, but the character was dropped from the storyline after Yarborough's death from a heart attack on December 19, 1951. Kathleen Wilson introduced the character of Claudia in 1932, continuing in the role until Claudia married in August 1943 and was written out of the story. When Claudia returned (1945–59), she was played by Barbara Fuller. Jack was portrayed by Page Gilman.

The Barbour grandchildren were named Teddy, Hank, Pinky, Margaret, Skipper, Joan, Penny, Nicky, Elizabeth, Jane, Mary Lou, Abigail, Deborah, and Constance.

Conrad Binyon played Henry Herbert Murray, Hank, from 1939 until his 1950 USAF / Calif. Air National Guard departure for the Korean War; he was replaced by Bill Idelson. In November 1947, Cousin Jediah X. Barbour (Clarence Hartzell) arrived at Sea Cliff. This gave the program an ambiance not unlike Vic and Sade, since Idelson played adopted son Rush on Vic and Sade, which also featured Hartzell as Uncle Fletcher Rush. The supporting cast in the 1930s and 1940s included Bill Bouchey, Tom Collins, Virginia Gregg, Bill Herbert, Wally Maher, Helen Musselman, Dan O'Herlihy, Walter Paterson, Ken Peters, Frank Provo, Jean Rouverol, Naomi Stevens, Janet Waldo and Ben Wright.

After 3,256 episodes, the radio series ceased production on April 24, 1959 (several sources give the date of May 8, 1959). One Man's Family was the longest-running serial drama in American radio broadcasting, edging out Ma Perkins (although Ma Perkins produced over twice as many episodes). Organist Paul Carson, who played the background music and the opening theme, "Destiny Waltz" (1932–41), composed the show's later theme, "Waltz Patrice" (aka "Patricia"). Among its other trademarks, episodes were introduced as if they were chapters from books.

Fiction
Beginning in April 1942, scripts for One Man's Family were rewritten as prose fiction and serialized in Movie-Radio Guide.

Satires
As the radio version was coming to a conclusion, another radio team, Bob and Ray---already noted for poking fun at such radio programs as Mr. Keen, Tracer of Lost Persons ("Mr. Trace, Keener Than Most Persons") and Backstage Wife ("Mary Backstayge, Noble Wife")---launched a dry continuing satire of One Man's Family, "One Fella's Family," as part of their daily 15-minute slot on CBS. "One Fella's Family" featured the two comedians as the Butcher family and lanced even the radio classic's signature chapter-and-verse introductions, with Ray Goulding giving the fictitious episode title and describing it, for example, "... which is taken from Book Vee Eye, Chapter Ex Eye, Pages 2,3,5,11, 243 and the top of page 244."

The show's title was also parodied by animator Tex Avery, in two of his MGM cartoons: 1943's One Ham's Family, and 1952's One Cab's Family.

Overseas
Two Australian versions of One Man's Family were broadcast in Australia in the late 1930s/early 1940s; in Sydney on 2CH and in Melbourne on 3XY. 3XY opened in 1935 and was originally a very low rating station, until the great popularity of One Man's Family changed its fortunes. The Melbourne version featured 3XY announcer Carl Bleazby (who later featured in the Australian Broadcasting Commission's popular TV series, Bellbird).  Doreen McKay portrayed Claudia on a 1939 Australian version.

Television

By 1949, when television expressed interest, the show focused on the Barbour children. Oldest daughter Hazel had twins, Claudia was rebellious and involved in romances, Claudia's twin brother Cliff had been married three times, and Jack was a 36-year-old father of six daughters, including triplets.

One Man's Family had the rare distinction of airing both in prime time and daytime television. The first TV version (November 4, 1949 - June 21, 1952) ran in prime time once a week for a half-hour and reverted the stories back to the 1932 storylines. Hazel was a 28-year-old who yearned for marriage, Cliff and Claudia were students at Stanford University, and Jack was ten years old. The prime time version focused on Fanny's attempts to mediate between her old-world husband and her independent-minded children.

The prime time series featured such future stars as Eva Marie Saint (Claudia), Tony Randall (Mac), Mercedes McCambridge (Beth Holly #1), and Frankie Thomas (Cliff Barbour #1). Claudia married daredevil Johnny Roberts (played by Michael Higgins). The show was live, which led to a notorious blooper when Claudia and her father-in-law (Ralph Locke) went to track Johnny down. The characters were in an airplane when Locke forgot his lines. After a few moments, he yelled at Saint, "Well, if you can't say anything, I'm leaving!" and walked off the set, in spite of his character being in the middle of a flight! Lest viewers presume the character had killed himself, Locke was in his seat the following day. The theme music was "Journey into Melody."

The daytime show (March 1, 1954 – April 1, 1955) carried many of the same storylines as the prime time version but with a different cast. Anne Whitfield, who played Claudia's daughter Penelope on the radio version, simultaneously played Claudia on the TV show. It also had different theme music, "Deserted Mansion."

All versions of the show were written, cast, produced and directed by Carlton E. Morse.

In 1965, General Foods offered to sponsor another version of One Man's Family on NBC, but NBC passed and picked up Days of Our Lives instead.

See also
List of radio soaps
List of longest-serving soap opera actors
 Michael Raffetto

References

Sources

Walter P. Sheppard, One Man's Family: A History 1932 to 1959 and a Script Analysis 1032 to 1944, University of Wisconsin, 1964 (doctoral dissertation; available through University Microfilms).  "Some Notes on 'One Man's Family,'" article drawn from the dissertation, Journal of Broadcasting, Vol. XIV, No. 2 (Spring 1970).

Listen to
RadioLovers: One Man's Family (two episodes)

External links
 Barbour family tree
 Classic Themes
 Did You Know?
 
 Meet the Barbours
 Museum of the City of San Francisco
 "One Man's Family" short story, Radio and Television Mirror, April 1940, page 21

1930s American radio programs
1932 radio programme debuts
1959 radio programme endings
1940s American radio programs
1950s American radio programs
1949 American television series debuts
1952 American television series endings
1954 American television series debuts
1955 American television series endings
American radio soap operas
American television soap operas
NBC original programming
Television series based on radio series
Black-and-white American television shows
English-language television shows
NBC radio programs
Radio programs adapted into television shows
Radio programs about families
Television series about families
Television shows set in San Francisco